"Cloudy Sunday" is a 1943 or 1944 song composed and originally performed by the Greek songwriter Vassilis Tsitsanis (1915–84). It is one of the most celebrated compositions in the popular genre of Rebetiko. It has been described as "a sort of unofficial national anthem".

Content
"Cloudy Sunday" is a love song with a strongly melancholy tone. The lyrics emphasize the protagonist's emotion while providing provides little or no factual detail. A. A. Fatouros notes that no name is provided for the female character and that it contains no obvious social or political context. However, he argues that "[f]or those who have heard it, for those who have danced to its music or sang it, when happy, sad, drunk or nostalgic, the feeling it expresses has a life of its own, an existence independent of any precise cause". Its first verses read, in Fatouros's translation:

Tsitsanis composed the song at Thessaloniki (Salonica) in German-occupied Northern Greece. At the time, he regularly performed to small audiences in a bar he owned as the German occupation authorities considered Rebetiko essentially degenerate and limited its outlets. It is thought to have been composed in 1943 or 1944 in the aftermath of the Great Famine (1941–42). Tsitsanis later wrote that "I wrote the Synnefiasmeni Kyriaki ('Cloudy Sunday') based on the tragic incidents that happened then in our country: starvation, misery, fear, depression, arrests, executions. The lyrics I wrote were inspired by this climate. The melody came out of the 'cloudy' occupation, out of the frustration we all suffered - then, when everything was shadowed under terror and was crushed by slavery."

Tsitsanis made several recordings of "Cloudy Sunday" from 1948. In spite of its limited audience during the occupation period itself, it is strongly associated with it in Greek popular culture.

References

Bibliography

Further reading

Year of song unknown
Axis occupation of Greece
History of Thessaloniki
Rebetiko
Greek-language songs
1943 in Greece
1944 in Greece
1940s songs